Luster is a municipality in Vestland county, Norway. It is located at the end of the Sognefjorden in the traditional district of Sogn. The administrative centre is the village of Gaupne. Other villages in Luster include Fortun, Hafslo, Indre Hafslo, Jostedal, Luster, Nes, Ornes, Skjolden, Solvorn, and Veitastrond.

Luster is centered around the inner branch of the Sognefjord, which is called the Lustrafjorden. Its landscape includes fjords, steep mountains, water-abundant waterfalls, blue glaciers, and valleys. Both Jostedalsbreen National Park and Breheimen National Park are partially located in this municipality. The Sognefjellsvegen road goes over a mountain pass in eastern Luster.

The  municipality is the 17th largest by area out of the 356 municipalities in Norway. Luster is the 177th most populous municipality in Norway with a population of 5,246.

In 2016, the chief of police for Vestlandet formally suggested a reconfiguration of police districts and stations. He proposed that the police station in Luster be closed.

General information

Lyster was established as a municipality on 1 January 1838 (see formannskapsdistrikt law). The original municipality was identical to the Lyster parish (prestegjeld) with the sub-parishes of Fortun, Dale, Nes, and Gaupne. During the 1960s, there were many municipal mergers across Norway due to the work of the Schei Committee. On 1 January 1963, the neighboring municipalities of Hafslo and Jostedal were merged with Luster, forming a much larger municipality. After the merger, Luster had 5,854 residents.

Since the consolidation of the three municipalities of Hafslo, Jostedal and Luster in 1963, the area has been characterized by scattered rural settlements and large distances between these settlements. Luster was the largest municipality by area in the old Sogn og Fjordane county.

On 1 January 2020, the municipality became part of the newly created Vestland county after Sogn og Fjordane and Hordaland counties were merged.

Name
The name (Old Norse Lústr) originally belonged to the fjord (now Lustrafjorden). The name is derived from the word ljóss which means "light" or "bright" - referring to the bright color of the water from the glaciers. Prior to 1918, the name was written Lyster.

Coat of arms
The coat of arms was granted on 20 April 1990. They show a circular silver-colored tilia twig on a blue background. Although they are newly designed, they are inspired by an old woodcarving found in the Urnes Stave Church which is located in Luster.

Churches
The Church of Norway has eight parishes within the municipality of Luster. It is part of the Sogn prosti (deanery) in the Diocese of Bjørgvin.

Government
All municipalities in Norway, including Luster, are responsible for primary education (through 10th grade), outpatient health services, senior citizen services, unemployment and other social services, zoning, economic development, and municipal roads. The municipality is governed by a municipal council of elected representatives, which in turn elect a mayor.  The municipality falls under the Sogn og Fjordane District Court and the Gulating Court of Appeal.

Municipal council
The municipal council  of Luster is made up of 25 representatives that are elected to four year terms. The party breakdown of the council is as follows:

Mayor
The mayor  of a municipality in Norway is usually a representative of the majority party of the municipal council who is elected to lead the council. The mayors of Luster (incomplete list):
2011–present: Ivar Kvalen (Sp)
2003-2011: Torodd Urnes (KrF)

Geography

Location
Luster, one of the largest municipalities in southern Norway, is located in the glacial mountains where the Sognefjorden begins its path to the North Sea. The fjord is fed by many large glaciers such as the Harbardsbreen, Holåbreen, Jostedalsbreen, Nigardsbreen, Spørteggbreen, and others.

It is bordered by four municipalities in Vestland county: Stryn to the north, Sunnfjord to the west, Sogndal to the southwest, and Årdal to the southeast. It is also bordered by three municipalities in Innlandet county: Skjåk to the northeast and by Lom and Vang to the east.

Feigumfoss waterfall

Mountains
The Hurrungane, Breheimen, and Jotunheimen mountains cover parts of the municipality. It is part of the Hurrungane mountain range which contains some of the most alpine peaks in Norway.

Lakes and Rivers
There are notable lakes such as Veitastrondsvatnet, Austdalsvatnet, Styggevatnet, Tunsbergdalvatnet, Prestesteinsvatnet, and Hafslovatnet. The river Jostedøla runs through the Jostedal valley and empties into the fjord at Gaupne.

Glaciers
The Jostedalsbreen glacier (including the arm called Nigardsbreen) is the biggest glacier in continental Europe, the highest point on it is Høgste Breakulen. It is located west of Jostedal, north of Gaupne, in Jostedalsbreen National Park, much of which is located in the municipality of Luster.  Other glaciers include the Austerdalsbreen, Harbardsbreen and Spørteggbreen.

Economy
The inhabitants of Luster make their living by farming, growing berries and fruit, tourism, and hydroelectricity. Jøstedal and Fortun have large hydroelectric power stations. Summer tourism is quite busy. Tourist activities include mountain climbing, skiing, fishing, hiking, and hunting.  The Sognefjellsvegen tourist road passes through Luster.

River fishing
Fishing permits (for salmon fishing) are sold for use on specific rivers, including Årøy-elva.

Culture and education

Historic churches

Urnes Stave Church
Urnes Stave Church was built around 1150 and is Norway's oldest Stave church. The Church lies majestically on the top of Urnes. The Stave church is one of four Norwegian Churches on UNESCO`s list of the most precious cultural monuments in the world.

The Stave churches are constructions of high quality, richly decorated with carvings. In virtually all of them the door frames are decorated from top to bottom with carvings. This tradition of rich ornamentation appears to go back to the animal carvings of the Viking age. The dragons are lovingly executed and transformed into long-limbed creatures of fantasy, here and there entwined with tendrils of vine, with winding stems and serrated leaves. The elaborate designs are executed with supreme artistic skill. The stave church doorways are, therefore, among the most distinctive works of art to be found in Norway. However, it is difficult to connect them with the Christian gospel.

Old Gaupne Church
The Old Gaupne Church is a magnificent church that was built in 1647 on a hill directly opposite Gaupne centre.

Dale Church
Dale Church is a stone church that was built in gothic style in the year 1250.

Breheim center
The Breheim Center contains a comprehensive exhibition. A journey through 20,000 years - from the Ice age to the present day, an audio/visual show takes visitors inside the glacier. Glacier boat M/S "Jostedalsrypa" crosses the Nigard Glacier Lake. There are internationally approved guides, glacier and climbing courses, and ski-trips.

Education
In 2020, 32% of the municipality's applicants for [secondary schooling] videregående skole, sought [non-vocational schooling],   studiespesialisering; [67% or] the rest of the applicants sought vocational schooling.

Notable inhabitants

 Gerhard Munthe (1795 in Hafslo - 1876) a military officer, historian and cartographer
 Christian Ellefson (1842 in Luster - 1925?) an American farmer, member of the Wisconsin State Assembly
 Peter J. Dale (1845 in Luster – 1935) a Norwegian-American member of the Wisconsin State Assembly
 Henrik Angell (1861 in Luster – 1922) a military officer, sportsman and writer; a ski pioneer and the first Norwegian delegate to the International Olympic Committee
 Sylfest Lomheim (born 1945 in Hafslo) a Norwegian philologist, academic and politician
 Tor Bremer (born 1955 in Luster) a farmer and politician
 Kurt Heggestad (born 1982 in Veitastrond) a Norwegian former professional footballer
 Stine Pettersen Reinås (born 1994 in Hafslo) is a Norwegian football defender, over 150 club caps and eight for the Norway women's national football team

Twin cities/towns
  Viroqua, Wisconsin, United States

Media gallery

References

External links

Municipal fact sheet from Statistics Norway 
Luster Municipality Website 
Urnes Stave Church

 
Municipalities of Vestland
1838 establishments in Norway